The Pakistan Technical Assistance Programme (PTAP) is a bilateral and multilateral assistance programme, primarily responsible for administering civilian foreign aid to other countries. The programme functions through administrating the financial donations, industrial training, and expertise to developing countries to the partnering nations who have foreign relations with Pakistan. Since its inception in 1950s, the programme distributes foreign aide that covers 65  developing countries including from Middle East, East Asia, Africa, and Latin America.

To further strengthen the image of Pakistan in the developing world, the PTAP offers educational training and expertise in commercial banking, railways, steel mill industries, postal services, and information technology that are arranged regularly on Annual Basis in Pakistan and overseas. Its counterpart is a military advisory program restricted only to long-term partnering nations who have maintained historically healthy relations with Pakistan.

Courses
International Commercial Banking Course at National Institute of Banking and Finance, State Bank of Pakistan, Islamabad.
International Central Banking Course at National Institute of Banking and Finance, State Bank of Pakistan, Islamabad.
Advanced Railway Course Pakistan Railways Academy, Walton, Lahore.
Postal Services/Information Technology Course.

International Training
International   trainings are jointly   sponsored   by     the  government   of 
Pakistan and State Bank of Pakistan under the Pakistan Technical Assistance Program (PTAP). The training programs are fully funded and are available to the nominees of friendly developing countries. The objectives of the training program are to create and foster goodwill, strengthen bilateral relations, 
and to share expertise, knowledge in the field of banking and finance. For the last three decades the  programs are in high demand and large number of bankers, government functionaries and officials of almost 105 developing countries have benefited from the program. NIBAF organized and hosted international trainings both in central and commercial banking each of 
four -week duration that were attended by 38 participants from about 19 developing countries. These countries included Bangladesh, Sri Lanka, Cambodia, Jordan, Nepal, Senegal, Thailand, Uzbekistan, Maldives, Sudan, Iran, Malawi, Myanmar, Senegal, Vietnam, Fiji, Afghanistan, and Indonesia.

International Training program for Securities Market Managers
International training program for securities market managers and compliance officers was launched in collaboration with South Asian Federation of Exchanges (SAFE) and Futures and Options Association (FOA) of UK at NIBAF Islamabad. This international training mainly focuses on international standards for the operation and management of securities and derivatives exchanges by covering in particular high level exchange management issues like conflict of interest management, trading practices and procedures, identification and prevention of market manipulation,  market supervision and enforcement and clearing  and settlement procedures.

References

Foreign relations of Pakistan
Multilateral relations of Pakistan
Contributions to foreign aid by country